Stress may refer to:

Science and medicine
 Stress (biology), an organism's response to a stressor such as an environmental condition
 Stress (linguistics), relative emphasis or prominence given to a syllable in a word, or to a word in a phrase or sentence
 Stress (mechanics), the internal forces that neighboring particles of a continuous material exert on each other
 Occupational stress, stress related to one's job
 Psychological stress, a feeling of strain and pressure
 Surgical stress, systemic response to surgical injury

Arts, entertainment, and media

Music

Groups and musicians
 Stress (Brazilian band), a Brazilian heavy metal band
 Stress (British band), a British rock band
 Stress (pop rock band), an early 1980s melodic rock band from San Diego
 Stress (musician) (born 1977), hip hop singer from Switzerland
 Stress (record producer) (born 1979), artistic name of Can Canatan, Swedish musician and record producer

Albums
 Stress (Anonymus album), 1997
 Stress (Daddy Freddy album), 1991
 Stress (Stress album), self-titled album by Brazilian band Stress
 Stress: The Extinction Agenda, 1994 album by Organized Konfusion

Songs
 "Stress" (Justice song), 2007 song by Justice
 "Stress" (Odd Børre song), 1968 song by Odd Børre
 "Stress", a song by Godsmack from Godsmack
 "Stress", a 2000 song by Jim's Big Ego
 "The Stress", a 1989 song by Chisato Moritaka

Other music
 Stress (music), a type of emphasis placed on a particular note or set of notes

Other arts, entertainment, and media 
 Stress (card game), a card game
 Stress (journal), a medical journal
 "Stress" (The Unit), an episode of the television series The Unit

Other uses
 Stress (font), varying stroke widths of a font

See also 
 
 Emphasis (disambiguation)
 Stress cracking (disambiguation)
 Stress intensity (disambiguation)
 Stress tensor (disambiguation)
 Stress test (disambiguation)
 Tension (disambiguation)